Kavir Kaj (also Romanized as Kavīr Kāj; also known as Kavīr Kach and Kavīr Kūshk) is a village in Kuh Yakhab Rural District, Dastgerdan District, Tabas County, South Khorasan Province, Iran. At the 2006 census, its population was 78, in 21 families.

References 

Populated places in Tabas County